The Winery Dogs are an American rock supergroup formed in 2012 by Mike Portnoy, Billy Sheehan and Richie Kotzen.

Background 
The idea of the band started out as a project featuring drummer Mike Portnoy and bassist Billy Sheehan, who were aiming to form a power trio rock band with a lead singer/guitarist as the frontman. After an aborted project, tentatively titled "Bad Apple", with guitarist/vocalist John Sykes, talk show host Eddie Trunk heard about it and suggested Richie Kotzen, who had previously played with Sheehan in the band Mr. Big from 1997 to 2002.

The three musicians got together at Richie Kotzen's studio in Los Angeles and at the end of the jam session, they had a few skeletons of songs that would appear on the debut album. After their first album success, they released a live concert DVD called Unleashed in Japan 2013: The Winery Dogs.

Prior to the Winery Dogs, all three members have had successful careers with other bands. Richie Kotzen is known as a former member of bands Poison and Mr. Big, as well as having a consistent solo career with many albums released. Billy Sheehan is known for playing with Steve Vai, David Lee Roth, Talas, and Mr. Big. Mike Portnoy is known for being the original drummer of bands Dream Theater, Flying Colors, Transatlantic, Neal Morse Band, Sons of Apollo and Adrenaline Mob.

When asked about the band's main influences, Mike Portnoy commented that they are working towards a classic rock sound, influenced by Led Zeppelin, Cream, Jimi Hendrix, Grand Funk Railroad, as well as newer artists such as Soundgarden, Alice in Chains, the Black Crowes and Lenny Kravitz.

The band's self-titled debut album was released in Japan on May 5, 2013 through Victor subsidiary WHD Entertainment, with a worldwide release following on July 23, 2013 through Loud & Proud Records. It was produced by Jay Ruston. It features 13 songs and they switched out the song "Time Machine" with the song "Criminal" for the Japan edition.

In June 2015, the band entered a studio around Los Angeles to record their second album. In a July interview, Portnoy said the album was about to begin mixing that month, and it should be released before they begin their October tour. The album, titled Hot Streak, was released on October 2, 2015.

The Winery Dogs also have a band clinic in the summer called Dog Camp. This camp allows musicians and fans to come meet, jam with and learn from the band. Not only does it include individual clinics, but it also incorporates a band setting as well.

In April 2017, it was announced by Kotzen that Winery Dogs were taking a break. Kotzen was quoted as saying the band were "still friends", however, and it's likely there will be more releases from them in the future.
The band performed the song "Elevate" at a tribute for David Z, bass player for Adrenaline Mob, who died in a car crash.

On December 5, 2018, Mike Portnoy announced that The Winery Dogs would go on a one-month tour of the U.S. in May 2019.

In November 2022, the band announced the upcoming release of their third album, III, on February 3, 2023.

Band members
 Mike Portnoy – drums, backing vocals (2012–present)
 Billy Sheehan – bass, backing vocals (2012–present)
 Richie Kotzen – guitars, keyboards, piano, lead vocals (2012–present)

Discography

Studio albums

EPs
 Dog Years (2017)

Live albums
 Unleashed in Japan 2013 (2013)
 Dog Years: Live in Santiago & Beyond 2013-2016 (2017)

References

External links

 

2012 establishments in New York City
American blues rock musical groups
American musical trios
American supergroups
Hard rock musical groups from New York (state)
Musical groups established in 2012
Musical groups from New York City